Zhaxar, or Zhexia, is a township in Bainang County, in the Shigatse prefecture-level city of the Tibet Autonomous Region of China. At the time of the 2010 census, the township had a population of 1,906. , it had 7 villages under its administration.

References 

Township-level divisions of Tibet
Populated places in Shigatse